The 2015 Nigerian Senate election in Imo State was held on March 28, 2015, to elect members of the Nigerian Senate to represent Imo State. Samuel Anyanwu representing Imo East and Hope Uzodinma representing Imo West won on the platform of Peoples Democratic Party, while Benjamin Uwajumogu representing Imo North won on the platform of All Progressives Congress.

Overview

Summary

Results

Imo East 
Peoples Democratic Party candidate Samuel Anyanwu won the election, defeating All Progressives Congress candidate Uchechukwu Onyeagocha and other party candidates.

Imo West 
Peoples Democratic Party candidate Hope Uzodinma won the election, defeating All Progressives Congress candidate Osita Izunaso and other party candidates.

Imo North 
All Progressives Congress candidate Benjamin Uwajumogu won the election, defeating Peoples Democratic Party candidate Achonu Nneji and other party candidates.

References 

Imo State Senate elections
March 2015 events in Nigeria
Imo